Lightspeed is a physical constant.

Lightspeed may also refer to:

Arts and literature
Lightspeed (album), the 2010 album by Destine
Lightspeed (film), a 2006 science fiction film
Lightspeed (magazine), an online fantasy and science fiction magazine 
Lightspeed (Transformers), a fictional character
Lightspeed (video game), a space simulation computer game released in 1990
Julie Power, a Marvel Comics superhero who goes by the name Lightspeed
"Lightspeed", a song by Dev from her album The Night The Sun Came Up

Organizations
Lightspeed (brokerage), a New York City based brokerage
Lightspeed Systems, a company that sells content-control and security software and systems for schools
Lightspeed Venture Partners, a venture capital firm
 Lightspeed (company), Canadian point-of-sale software provider

Other
LIGHT SPEED, the callsign of Executive Express Aviation

See also
Litespeed (disambiguation)